= Bath FC =

Bath FC may refer to:

- Bath City F.C., the association football club, founded in 1889 as Bath AFC
- Bath Rugby, the rugby union club, founded in 1865 as Bath Football Club
